The 1943 Vanderbilt Commodores football team represented Vanderbilt University during the 1943 college football season.

Schedule

References

Vanderbilt
Vanderbilt Commodores football seasons
College football undefeated seasons
Vanderbilt Commodores football